Rotten Apple is the second studio album by American rapper Lloyd Banks, released October 10, 2006 via G-Unit and Interscope. The title of the album is a play on the New York City nickname, "The Big Apple". The album cover also resembles the cover of the film, King of New York.

Background
The Big Withdrawal was originally intended to be Lloyd Banks' second album. However, two women Banks had a ménage à trois with in 2005 leaked an unmastered copy of the album he had left at their home. The album was scrapped and soon after, Banks began working on Rotten Apple.

The album featured guest appearances from 50 Cent, Tony Yayo, Young Buck, Rakim, Scarface, Mobb Deep, 8 Ball, Keri Hilson and Musiq Soulchild. Production on the album was provided by Eminem, Needlz, Sha Money XL, Younglord, Ron Browz, Havoc and 9th Wonder. Banks stated that he wanted to show the darker side of New York City and allow listeners to hear what it was like growing up in South Jamaica, Queens.

Critical reception

Rotten Apple received generally mixed reviews from critics. The album so far has a score of 51 out of 100 from Metacritic based on "mixed or average reviews". Rolling Stone'''s Evan Serpick gave it 3 out of 5 stars and said that "Eminem, Mobb Deep's Havoc and a host of G-Unit regulars produce an album’s worth of chunky, ominous beats to fit Banks’ foul mood, but it runs a little thin over sixteen tracks." AllHipHop gave it a score of three-and-a-half stars out of five and said that it was "primed to remind folks what crew controlled the game before his hiatus."  DJ Booth gave it three stars out of five and said it "doesn't offer the same amount of high energy bangers. Subsequently, the label is now left to wonder what would have been if their decision on a lead single was different from the jump off."

But XXL gave it a L/XXL (the equivalent of three stars out of five) and said, "Not falling far from 50 Cent’s platinum-rooted tree, Rotten Apple is fertilized with potent doses of sonic strength and catchy hooks. But overall, it isn’t the new massacre that'll shake New York hip-hop down to its core." AllMusic's David Jeffries gave it 2.5 out of 5 stars and said that "The highlights are way high, but the album as a whole is fans-only." HipHopDX gave it a similar score of two-and-a-half stars out of five and said, "Much like Banks' rapping, the beats just plod along. It is easy to expect less from some of his less talented G-Unit brethren, but Banks has shown himself to be capable of a lot. Minus a few moments where he shines, this album is as rotten as the City."

After five weeks of sales the album was at number 71 on the Billboard'' charts with 15,000 copies sold that week and 250,000 copies sold total. Despite not being certified in the United States, the album managed to achieve Gold status in Canada.

Commercial performance
Debuting at number 3 with 143,000, Banks fell more than 40,000 albums short of a chart-topping repeat. The album fell to number 15 the following week with sales of 49,000.
In its third week, the album sold 25,000.
In its fourth week, the album sold 19,000 to land at number 43 on the album chart.
In its fifth week the album sold 15,000 to land at number 71 on the charts.

Track listing

Notes
 signifies an additional producer.

Certifications

Charts

Weekly charts

Year-end charts

References

External links
 

2006 albums
Lloyd Banks albums
Interscope Records albums
G-Unit Records albums
Albums produced by Eminem
Albums produced by Havoc (musician)
Albums produced by 9th Wonder
Albums produced by Ron Browz
Albums produced by Needlz
Albums produced by Nick Speed